Atlantic Summer was a Canadian informational television series which aired on CBC Television from 1978 to 1979.

Premise
This talk show originated from Atlantic Canada. In the first season, two weeks were produced from Halifax, Nova Scotia while another two weeks was produced from St. John's, Newfoundland and Labrador. Halifax hosts were Denny Doherty and Sharon Dunn while Shirley Newhook of St. John's daytime series Coffee Break was the host from that city. The second season originated from St. John's.

Scheduling
The series aired throughout the national CBC network weekdays at 1:00 p.m. (Eastern) from 9 August to 1 September 1978. The second season was broadcast 3:00 p.m. weekdays from 16 to 27 July 1979.

References

External links
 
 

CBC Television original programming
1978 Canadian television series debuts
1979 Canadian television series endings
Television shows filmed in Halifax, Nova Scotia